The Moskvitch 2142 is a line of large family cars produced by AZLK's Moskvitch division from 1998 to its bankruptcy in 2002. It was the last and most advanced line of Moskvitch vehicles, marking the end of the fifth generation. Only 3500 vehicles were produced, all aimed at executive and business markets.

History

Three versions of the 2142 were marketed: the Knjaz Vladimir (large family saloon), Ivan Kalita (executive saloon), and the Duet (executive coupé), which was introduced several months later. The Knjaz Vladimir was the least expensive of the brand, followed by the more upscale Ivan Kalita, both of whom were introduced in September 1998. The Duet, introduced in May 1999, was a shortened variant based on the bodyshell of the 2141 Aleko and using the ornate, chromed grille of the Ivan Kalita. In 2002, just four months before failure, the Duet received a slight grille facelift update, using a sleeker unit similar to that of the Knjaz Vladimir (Series II).

All 2142 models were fitted with Renault engines, which was an initiative on the side of the projected merger with AvtoVAZ in the late 1990s. Seeing as AvtoVAZ was in direct competition to AZLK at the time, and succeeded much more in lower-scale demand, Renault rejected the offer in 2002, forcing AZLK to stop production. All models were discontinued by mid-August 2002, and the company filed for bankruptcy on 3 September 2002.

References

External links
 Official Moskvitch Web Site, Models Page
 Overview of the 2142 Knjaz Vladimir
 Overview of the 2142 Ivan Kalita
 Overview of the 2142 Duet
 Overview of the 2142 Duet II

2142
Cars of Russia